Perimedes (Ancient Greek: Περιμήδης) was a name attributed to several characters in Greek mythology.

Perimedes, a Centaur, son of Peuceus, who attended Pirithous's wedding and fought against the Lapiths.
Perimedes, a prince of Tiryns as son of King Eurystheus and Antimache, daughter of Amphidamas of Arcadia. He was the brother of Admete, Alexander, Iphimedon, Mentor and Eurybius. Perimedes was killed by the Athenians in the war that ensued when Athens refused to deliver the Heracleidae up to Eurystheus. Alternately, Perimedes, along with his brothers Eurybius and Eurypylus, was slain by Heracles when at a sacrificial meal in honor of his Twelve Labors being completed they served him a smaller portion of meat than they did for themselves.
Perimedes, father of the Phocian Schedius who participated in the Trojan War.
Perimedes, a defender of Troy from Smintheus's grove who was killed by Neoptolemus.
Perimedes, a singer from Argos, said to have had many disciples.
Perimedes, one of Odysseus's companions during his return voyage from Troy according to the Odyssey. He is very loyal to Odysseus throughout the story.
Perimedes, one of the Suitors of Penelope who came from Same along with other 22 wooers. He, with the other suitors, was killed by Odysseus with the aid of Eumaeus, Philoetius, and Telemachus.

Notes

References 

 Apollodorus, The Library with an English Translation by Sir James George Frazer, F.B.A., F.R.S. in 2 Volumes, Cambridge, MA, Harvard University Press; London, William Heinemann Ltd. 1921. ISBN 0-674-99135-4. Online version at the Perseus Digital Library. Greek text available from the same website.
 Athenaeus of Naucratis, The Deipnosophists or Banquet of the Learned. London. Henry G. Bohn, York Street, Covent Garden. 1854. Online version at the Perseus Digital Library.
 Athenaeus of Naucratis, Deipnosophistae. Kaibel. In Aedibus B.G. Teubneri. Lipsiae. 1887. Greek text available at the Perseus Digital Library.
 Homer, The Iliad with an English Translation by A.T. Murray, Ph.D. in two volumes. Cambridge, MA., Harvard University Press; London, William Heinemann, Ltd. 1924. . Online version at the Perseus Digital Library.
 Hesiod, Shield of Heracles from The Homeric Hymns and Homerica with an English Translation by Hugh G. Evelyn-White, Cambridge, MA.,Harvard University Press; London, William Heinemann Ltd. 1914. Online version at the Perseus Digital Library. Greek text available from the same website.
 Homer, Homeri Opera in five volumes. Oxford, Oxford University Press. 1920. . Greek text available at the Perseus Digital Library.
 Homer, The Odyssey with an English Translation by A.T. Murray, PH.D. in two volumes. Cambridge, MA., Harvard University Press; London, William Heinemann, Ltd. 1919. . Online version at the Perseus Digital Library. Greek text available from the same website.
 Pausanias, Description of Greece with an English Translation by W.H.S. Jones, Litt.D., and H.A. Ormerod, M.A., in 4 Volumes. Cambridge, MA, Harvard University Press; London, William Heinemann Ltd. 1918. . Online version at the Perseus Digital Library
 Pausanias, Graeciae Descriptio. 3 vols. Leipzig, Teubner. 1903.  Greek text available at the Perseus Digital Library.
 Quintus Smyrnaeus, The Fall of Troy translated by Way. A. S. Loeb Classical Library Volume 19. London: William Heinemann, 1913. Online version at theio.com
 Quintus Smyrnaeus, The Fall of Troy. Arthur S. Way. London: William Heinemann; New York: G.P. Putnam's Sons. 1913. Greek text available at the Perseus Digital Library.

Centaurs
Trojans
Characters in the Iliad
Characters in the Odyssey
Suitors of Penelope